Below are the squads for the 2004 AFF Championship, co-hosted by Vietnam and Malaysia, which took place between 7 December 2004 and 16 January 2005.  The players' listed age is their age on the tournament's opening day (7 December 2004).

Group A

Indonesia
Coach:  Peter Withe

Singapore
Coach:  Radojko Avramović

Vietnam
Coach:  Edson Tavares, Trần Văn Khánh (v. Laos)

Laos
Coach: Bounlap Khenkitisack

Cambodia
Coach: Som Saran

Group B

Myanmar
Coach:  Ivan Venkov Kolev

Malaysia
Coach:  Bertalan Bicskei

Thailand
Coach:  Sigfried Held

Philippines
Coach: Jose Ariston Caslib

Timor-Leste
Coach:  José Luís

References 

AFF Championship squads
squads